Cisówek may refer to the following places:
Cisówek, Augustów County in Podlaskie Voivodeship (north-east Poland)
Cisówek, Suwałki County in Podlaskie Voivodeship (north-east Poland)
Cisówek, Warmian-Masurian Voivodeship (north Poland)